Benešov nad Ploučnicí is a town in Děčín District in the Ústí nad Labem Region of the Czech Republic. It has about 3,600 inhabitants. The town centre with the castle complex is well preserved and is protected by law as an urban monument zone.

Administrative parts
The village of Ovesná is an administrative part of Benešov nad Ploučnicí.

Geography
It lies in the Central Bohemian Uplands. The Ploučnice river flows through the town.

History
The first written mention of Benešov is from 1311. The town was probably founded in the 1230s. Existence of the church is first mentioned in 1352.

Sights

The town is known for its castle complex, made up of seven buildings in the Saxon Renaissance style. It contains two castles (called Dolní and Horní – "Upper" and "Lower"), Church of the Nativity of the Virgin Mary, Chapel of the Sorrowful Mother of God, and three houses. The complex was built by the Salhausen noble family in the 16th century.

Notable people
Kurt Pscherer (1915–2000), Austrian theatre director
Roland Ducke (1934–2005), German footballer
Peter Ducke (born 1941), German footballer

Twin towns – sister cities

Benešov nad Ploučnicí is twinned with:
 Heidenau, Germany

References

External links

Cities and towns in the Czech Republic
Populated places in Děčín District